Herbert Victor Johnson (25 October 1889 – 10 July 1962) was an Australian politician. He was a member of the Australian Labor Party (ALP) and served in the House of Representatives from 1940 to 1948. He was Minister for the Interior in the Chifley Government from 1945 to 1949.

Early life
Johnson was born in Northampton, Western Australia and educated at the local convent school.  He worked as a shearer and became the first Western Australian shearer to join the Australian Workers' Union (AWU) when it organized the shearers in 1908.  In 1913 he married Ethel May Lucas.  He is said to have "sheared 3761 sheep in 17½ days in 1914 – a world record at that time".  As an AWU organizer, he worked hard to maintain the conditions of pastoral workers during the 1920s and 1930s.  He was secretary of the Geraldton branch of the Australian Labor Party from 1920 to 1934. In 1936, he was elected state secretary of the AWU and moved to the Perth suburb of Highgate.

Political career

In 1940, Johnson won a by-election for Kalgoorlie.  On the death of John Curtin in July 1945, he was elected by the parliamentary caucus to the ensuing vacancy in the ministry and he was appointed Minister for the Interior—which among other things was responsible for northern development—and Assistant-Minister for Works and Housing from 1945 to 1946.  He was chairman of the Australian War Memorial's board of management from 1945 to 1949 and gained funding for its expansion to house collections from World War II.  His appointment as minister lapsed with the defeat of the Chifley government at the 1949 election.  He was unhappy with H. V. Evatt's leadership of the party during the 1955 split that led to the creation of the Democratic Labor Party and publicly expressed his concerns in 1957.  This led the party to withhold endorsement of his candidacy at future elections, although he had already decided to retire at the 1958 election.

Personal life
He died in 1962 at Royal Perth Hospital, survived by his wife, two of his three sons and three of his four daughters.

Notes
http://nla.gov.au/nla.news-article71430177?searchTerm=herbert%20victor%20johnson&searchLimits=l-australian=y

 

1889 births
1962 deaths
Australian Labor Party members of the Parliament of Australia
Members of the Australian House of Representatives for Kalgoorlie
Members of the Australian House of Representatives
Members of the Cabinet of Australia
Australian trade unionists
People from Northampton, Western Australia
20th-century Australian politicians
Sheep shearers